The Raja Uda MRT station, or Raja Uda–UTM station due to sponsorship reasons, is a mass rapid transit (MRT) station that serves the neighborhood of Kampung Baru in Kuala Lumpur, Malaysia. It is one of the stations under the MRT Putrajaya Line.

The station began operations on 16 March 2023.

Station details

Location 
The station is located on Jalan Raja Muda Abdul Aziz in the Kampung Baru subdistrict. It is one of two stations in the area, the other being  Kampung Baru station on the Kelana Jaya Line.

Exits and entrances 
Entrance A, B and D is currently open for public entry except for Entrance C which has not been built yet.

Nearby
The station is behind Menara TH Selborn, currently housing the Federal Territory branch offices of the Election Commission of Malaysia.
The station is also nearby the National Library of Malaysia and the National Heart Institute (IJN).

References

External links
 Klang Valley Mass Rapid Transit
 MRT Hawk-Eye View

Rapid transit stations in Kuala Lumpur
Sungai Buloh-Serdang-Putrajaya Line
Railway stations scheduled to open in 2023